Nizhniye Mully is a rural locality (a selo) in Kultayevskoye Rural Settlement, Permsky District, Perm Krai, Russia. The population was 838 as of 2010. There are 39 streets.

Geography 
Nizhniye Mully is located 27 km southwest of Perm (the district's administrative centre) by road. Murashi is the nearest rural locality.

References 

Rural localities in Permsky District